Chickasha  is a city in and the county seat of Grady County, Oklahoma, United States. The population was 16,036 at the 2010 census. Chickasha is home to the University of Science and Arts of Oklahoma. The city is named for and strongly connected to Native American heritage, as "Chickasha" (Chikashsha) is the Choctaw word for Chickasaw.

History
Chickasha was founded by Hobart Johnstone Whitley, a land developer, banker, farmer and Rock Island Railroad executive. The founding took place in 1892 when the Chicago, Rock Island and Pacific Railway (Rock Island) built a track through Indian Territory. A post office was established in June 1892. One of the earliest industrial plants to come to Chickasha was the Chickasha Cotton Oil Company, which was established in 1899. The town incorporated in 1902.

At the time of its founding, Chickasha was located in Pontotoc County, Chickasaw Nation.

In 1908, the Oklahoma Industrial Institute and College for Girls was established in Chickasha. A local rancher named J. B. Sparks donated land for the school in memory of his daughter, Nellie. The girl was a Chickasaw descendant, and the land had been part of her allotment. The Nellie Sparks Dormitory commemorated her. The school was renamed as the Oklahoma College for Women in 1916. It became coeducational in 1965, and was renamed the Oklahoma College of Liberal Arts. It was renamed again in 1975 as the University of Science and Arts of Oklahoma.

The Wilson and Bonfis Flying School opened in October 1941 to train cadets of the U.S. Army Air Force. Over eight thousand cadets completed training there during World War II. After the war, the facility became the Chickasha Municipal Airport.

Also during the war, the army built and used Borden General Hospital. This site now contains Grady Memorial Hospital, Five Oaks Medical Group, Southern Plains Medical Center and Borden Park.

A prisoner of war camp established in 1944 is now the site of the Grady County Fairgrounds.

Geography
I-44 passes through the southeast side of the city, with access from Exits 80 and 83, and leads southwest  to Lawton. U.S. Route 62 runs through the city as Choctaw Avenue, leading east and then northeast  to Blanchard and west 18 miles to Anadarko. U.S. Route 81 passes through the city center, leading south  to Duncan and north  to El Reno. U.S. Route 277 enters Chickasha from the south with US 81 and leaves to the east with US 62.

Line Creek passes through the north part of the city and flows into the Washita River about one mile northeast of the city.

The Washita River flows through the northern end of the city, then turns south and forms part of the city's eastern border.

Climate

Demographics

As of the 2010 Census, there were 16,036 people, 6,374 households, and 3,898 families residing in the city. From 2000 to 2010, the Chickasha city population growth percentage was 1.2% (or from 15,850 people to 16,036 people). There were 7,380 housing units. The racial makeup of the city was 80.0% White, 7.1% African American, 4.8% Native American, 0.5% Asian, 0.1% Pacific Islander, 2.1% from other races, and 5.4% from two or more races. Hispanic or Latino of any race were 6.5% of the population.

Of the 6,434 households, 27.0% had children under the age of 18 living with them, 41.5% were married couples living together, 14.5% had a female householder with no husband present, and 38.8% were non-families. 32.3% of all households were made up of individuals, and 13.6% had someone living alone who was 65 years of age or older. The average household size was 2.35 and the average family size was 2.95.

The population included 22.8% under the age of 18, 12.4% from 18 to 24, 24.9% from 25 to 44, 24.6% from 45 to 64, and 15.3% who were 65 years of age or older. The median age was 36 years. For every 100 females, there were 91.9 males. For every 100 females age 18 and over, there were 87.3 males.

According to the 2009-2013 American Community Survey (ACS), the median income for a household in the city was $38,341, and the median income for a family was $44,547. Males had a median income of $38,987 versus $27,357 for females. The per capita income for the city was $20,848. About 12.9% of families and 17.9% of the population were below the poverty line, including 26.0% of those under age 18 and 10.8% of those age 65 or over.

Economy
Agriculture, particularly wheat production, and cattle raising have been important to the city's economy since its earliest days. Manufacturing became important about the middle of the 20th century. ArvinMeritor Replacement Parts and Delta Faucet opened facilities in the 1970s.

Arts and culture

The city's annual Festival of Light takes place at the  Shannon Springs Park and opens nightly from around Thanksgiving to the end of December. Concessions, carriage rides, pictures with Santa, and shopping are available. The Festival of Light has received many prestigious awards over the years including Regional Event of the Year, A.B.A. Top 100 Event, National Top 25 Holiday Event, Festival of the Year, Best Community Festival Event and Best Place to Take Out of Town Visitors. The festival has been featured statewide on Discover Oklahoma, ranked as a Top Place to Visit by Fine Living Network (2004), and designated as an official 2007 Oklahoma Centennial Event. Over 140 businesses and clubs sponsor the event in various ways. The installation of lights in 290 trees,  of walk-ways, bridges, arbors, gazebos and buildings begins in September; however, it takes through March to get the lights taken down and stored away. More than 1,200 volunteers donate time and skill, and now Display Sponsors have reached the 100 mark. The park has over 3.5 million lights, and the crystal pedestrian bridge boasts over 75,000 lights alone. It draws together over a thousand local volunteers and more than 250,000 visitors from across the United States.

The University of Science and Arts of Oklahoma hosts an annual festival, the Spring Triad, which is made up of the Montmartre Chalk Art Festival, the Droverstock music festival, and the Scholastic Meet. The event is held annually on the first Thursday of April. The art festival is held around the USAO Oval, where over 700 artists compete in a chalk art contest. Droverstock features over 12 hours of live music from various bands of all styles and genres. There are also many vendors, inflatables, and activities associated with the festival. The Scholastic Meet attracts around 1000 students annually from over 50 Oklahoma counties who compete in academic disciplines such as math, science, music, history, and other subjects. The competition is the largest academic meet in the state. Overall, the day-long event attracts thousands into the community.

The Muscle Car Ranch located on the south edge of Chickasha hosts an annual swap meet and concert, which is held in August. The concert has featured rock and roll groups such as The Byrds, The Grass Roots, Paul Revere & the Raiders, Jefferson Airplane, The Lovin' Spoonful, Firefall, John Conlee, Dr. Hook and Bad Company.

From a small local swapmeet, the Chickasha Pre-war Swap Meet has evolved to be one of the significant swapmeets for owners and collectors of cars from before 1942 (World War II). According to numerous posts in the forum of the Model T Club of America, the Chickasha Pre-war Swap Meet is considered the best Ford Model T swapmeet in the US.

Parks and recreation
Lake Chickasha is a City-owned lake located northwest of town in neighboring Caddo County.  It offers recreation such as swimming, boating, and water sports, as well as hiking, camping, and playground usage.

Shannon Springs Park has a splash pad and pool, free fishing for those under 16 or over 65, playground equipment, an outdoor amphitheater, pavilions and more.  Events are held here such as the annual Festival of Lights.

The Chickasha Sports Complex hosts regional baseball, softball and soccer tournaments, as well as facilitating local games and practice sessions.

Government
Chickasha has an elected mayor and city council, with a city manager on its staff.

Education

Chickasha Public School District includes Chickasha High School, Chickasha Middle School, Lincoln Elementary, Grand Elementary, and the Bill Wallace Early Childhood Center.

Chickasha is the current location of a historic schoolhouse that served black children in Grady County. Verden Separate School was built by African American Allen Toles on his own property in the nearby town of Verden in 1910. The school operated until 1935. The school building was rediscovered by historians in 2004 and restored and relocated to Chickasha. It was placed on the National Register of Historic Places in 2005.

A branch of Canadian Valley Technology Center provides vocational and community education in Chickasha.

The University of Science and Arts of Oklahoma, Oklahoma's public liberal arts college, is located in Chickasha. It was founded in 1908 by the Oklahoma State Legislature as Oklahoma Industrial Institute and College for Girls. The school's name was officially changed to Oklahoma College for Women in 1916.  In 1965, the school became coeducational, and its name was changed to Oklahoma College of Liberal Arts. The school is currently known as the University of Science and Arts of Oklahoma.

Infrastructure

Transportation
Chickasha is served by Interstate 44, US Route 62, US Route 81, US Route 277, US Route 62, State 39, State 19, and State 92.

Chickasha Municipal Airport (KCHK; FAA ID CHK), owned by the city and about 3 miles northwest, has multiple runways, the longest of which is 5101 ft by 100 ft and concrete-surfaced.  

Commercial air transportation is available at Will Rogers World Airport, about 38 miles northeast.

Rail freight service is provided by Union Pacific.  Union Pacific honors Chickasha as a “Train Town USA,” one of 131 communities out of the 7,300 communities it serves, because of the town’s unique, long-standing relationship with the railroad.

Notable people

 Stephen Alexander, American football tight end who played for the Washington Redskins and a few other teams
 Chet Allen, actor who co-starred in NBC's The Troubleshooters (1959–1960)
 Patricia Barchas, anthropologist from Stanford University who created the academic field of social neuroscience
 Dudley Dickerson, actor and comedian
 Dane Evans, professional  CFL quarterback
 Ada Lois Sipuel Fisher, African-American lawyer, administrator and activist
 Shug Fisher, western film and TV character actor, singer, songwriter, comedian and member of the Sons of the Pioneers
 Emmett Goodwin, former chief of police in Chickasha who was murdered by a fellow officer
 Jeane Porter Hester, cancer researcher and co-developer of the IBM 2997 computerized blood cell separator
 Cowboy Hill, college football player for the University of Oklahoma and professional player from 1923-26
 Kendra Horn, congresswoman
 Terry Humphrey, Major League Baseball player
 Jed Johnson, newspaper editor and politician, served as representative in the U.S. Congress
 Jed Johnson, Jr., son of Jed Johnson, U.S. representative from Oklahoma - the youngest person ever legally seated in the House of Representatives
 JaCoby Jones, Major League Baseball player, outfielder for the Detroit Tigers
 Merle Kilgore, country music personality
 Cleavon Little, actor and comedian
 Jack McCracken, basketball player in the 1930s and 1940s
 Don McNeill, American tennis player
 Scott Meacham, Oklahoma politician
 Orville Moody, professional golfer
 Lee Pace, actor
 Sam Rayburn, defensive tackle for the Philadelphia Eagles (2003–2006), San Francisco 49ers (2007) and Miami Dolphins (2007)
 Leon Polk Smith, painter
 Randy Souders, artist born in Chickasha
 Robert Streb, PGA tour golfer
 Mary Frances Thompson (Te Ata Fisher), Chickasaw actress; attended USAO in Chickasha
 Kelby Tomlinson, Major League Baseball player with the San Francisco Giants from 2015-18
 Bill Wallace, children's author; the Early Childhood Education Center in Chickasha bears his name
 Reggie Willits, former baseball player for the Los Angeles Angels and current volunteer assistant coach for the University of Oklahoma baseball team
 Dean Wooldridge, prominent engineer in the aerospace industry

References

Sources

External links

 City of Chickasha official website
 Chickasha Chamber of Commerce
 Encyclopedia of Oklahoma History and Culture - Chickasha

Oklahoma City metropolitan area
Cities in Grady County, Oklahoma
Cities in Oklahoma
County seats in Oklahoma
1892 establishments in Oklahoma Territory
Populated places established in 1892